Charlotte is an unincorporated community in Livingston County, Illinois, United States.

Notable people
Thomas Donovan, Lieutenant Governor of Illinois, was born in Charlotte.

Notes

Unincorporated communities in Livingston County, Illinois
Unincorporated communities in Illinois